The 2014 U.S. House of Representatives elections in Indiana was held on Tuesday, November 4, 2014 to elect 9 members of the U.S. House of Representatives from Indiana. The Members elected at this election will serve in the 114th Congress. Indiana has placed Republican and Democratic nominees on the ballot in a nation-best 189 consecutive U.S. House races across each of the last 19 election cycles since 1978.

Overview

By district
Results of the 2014 United States House of Representatives elections in Indiana by district:

District 1

Primary results

General election

District 2

Republican Congresswoman Jackie Walorski, who was narrowly elected over Democratic nominee Brendan Mullen in 2012, will seek re-election. Mullen announced he will not seek a rematch. Joe Bock, a University of Notre Dame administrator, is running for the Democratic nomination. Ryan Dvorak, a state representative, was a potential Democratic candidate, but he did not run.

Primary results

General election

District 3

Primary results

General election

District 4

Primary results

General election

District 5

Primary results

General election

District 6

Primary results

General election

District 7

Primary results

General election

District 8

Republican Congressman Larry Bucshon held this seat and was re-elected in 2014.

Primary results

General election

District 9

Republican Congressman Todd Young held this seat and was re-elected in 2014.

Primary results

General election

See also
 2014 United States House of Representatives elections
 2014 United States elections

References

External links
U.S. House elections in Indiana, 2014 at Ballotpedia
Campaign contributions at OpenSecrets

Indiana
2014
United States House of Representatives